Gavin Lurssen is an American mastering engineer. He owns Lurssen Mastering in Hollywood, California.  Lurssen's Grammy Award–winning work includes Raising Sand, a collaborative album featuring Alison Krauss and Robert Plant, and the soundtrack for the Coen Brothers film, O Brother, Where Art Thou?.  He has also mastered recordings by Tom Waits, Sheryl Crow, Loretta Lynn, Matchbox Twenty, T-Bone Burnett, Jennette McCurdy and many others. Lurssen is an alumnus of Berklee College of Music.

Discography
This is a partial discography of recordings mastered by Gavin Lurssen.

Albums

Soundtracks

Reissues

Assistant

Awards

Grammy Awards

2002: Album of the Year - O Brother, Where Art Thou? Soundtrack
2004: Best Historical Album - Martin Scorsese Presents the Blues: A Musical Journey
2009: Album of the Year - Raising Sand (Robert Plant & Alison Krauss)

Latin Grammy Awards

2010: Best Engineered Album: Distinto (Diego Torres)
2015: Best Rock Album: B (Diamante Eléctrico)

References

External links
Official site for Lurssen Mastering
[ AllMusic Credits]

Living people
American audio engineers
Grammy Award winners
Latin Grammy Award winners
Year of birth missing (living people)
Mastering engineers